Oh Ha-nee is a South Korean actress. She is known for her roles in dramas such as Goodbye to Goodbye, Tempted, The Crowned Clown and Three Bold Siblings. She also appeared in movies The Shameless, A Special Lady, Diva and The Age of Shadows.

Filmography

Television series

Film

Awards and nominations

References

External links 
 
 

1990 births
21st-century South Korean actresses
Living people
South Korean television actresses
South Korean film actresses